Jennings is a city in, and the parish seat of, Jefferson Davis Parish, Louisiana, United States, near Lake Charles. The population was 10,383 at the 2010 census, a small decline from the 2000 tabulation. 

Jennings is the principal city of the Jennings Micropolitan Statistical Area, which includes all of Jefferson Davis Parish. It is also part of the larger Lake Charles-Jennings Combined Statistical Area. It is also part of the large, 22-parish Acadiana region of the state, with a large Francophone population, many descended from early Acadian settlers.

History

For whom the town was named, Jennings McComb was an Irish contractor for the Southern Pacific Railroad. He built the Jennings depot on a divide peculiar to the southwest Louisiana. This became the center of new development based on the railroad. The first settler was recorded as A. D. McFarlain, who came in 1881 from St. Mary Parish and opened a store. McFarlain also became the first rice grower, postmaster, brickmaker, and builder in the community. Prospering with Jennings’ growth, McFarlain was considered one of the town's prominent businessmen and civic leaders.

The Jennings area attracted numerous wheat farmers from Iowa, Kansas, Nebraska, and other Midwestern states. The new settlers of southwest Louisiana were referred to as "Yankees" by the natives, who were of Acadian French and African-American descent. They had settled along the waterways in the parish, which they had relied on for transportation before the railroad. They fished in the bayous. The Cajuns gave appreciable aid to the settlers in homesteading and homemaking. The people grew rice, cotton, sweet potatoes, and corn.

Sylvester L. Cary reached this area on February 7, 1883, from Iowa. He became known as the town's "father," as he persuaded other Iowans to relocate there. He said he was "seeking a home where there was neither winter nor mortgages." So impressed was Cary by the fertile country around the Jennings depot that he shared his findings with others. He attracted fellow Midwesterners to southwest Louisiana by writing to friends in Iowa, extolling the area. When he returned to Iowa to pack up his family for the move to Jennings, he persuaded several neighbors preparing to migrate west, to follow him to Jennings and southwest Louisiana.

Much of southwest Louisiana was developed by the North American Land and Timber Co., which owned large portions of land. Seaman A. Knapp, president of the Iowa State College of Agriculture, was engaged in 1885 to demonstrate the region's suitability for rice production. Knapp attracted a number of Iowans to settle the area. The land company placed advertisements in newspapers published in the Midwestern states.

On May 2, 1888, the settlement of Jennings was incorporated as a village. In 1901, a fire destroyed a large portion of the wooden structures in Jennings.

That same year, Jennings was the site of the first oil well to produce in Louisiana, revealing its first oil field. Oil brought a boom to the town for a period. When oil production declined, the basic agricultural economy of the parish supported the town.

Geography 

Climate 
The climate in this area is characterized by hot, humid summers and generally mild to cool winters.  According to the Köppen Climate Classification system, Jennings has a humid subtropical climate, abbreviated "Cfa" on climate maps.

Demographics 

As of the 2020 United States census, there were 9,837 people, 3,862 households, and 2,390 families residing in the city.

Notable people

 A.C. Clemons (1921–1992), served in the Louisiana State Senate
 Chancy Croft (born 1937)  Born in Jennings.  Moved to Odessa, Texas, then Anchorage, Alaska.  President of the Alaska Senate (1975–1977), Democratic Party nominee for Alaska governor (1978), President of the University of Alaska Board of Regents (2001–2002).
Avalon Daggett, filmmaker
Cleve Francis (born 1945), Country music artist, released three albums in the early 1990s.
 John E. Guinn, current member of the Louisiana House of Representatives from Jennings
 Eugene John Hebert (1923–1990), Society of Jesus Roman Catholic priest who disappeared in Sri Lanka
 W. Scott Heywood (1872–1950), member of the Louisiana State Senate from 1932–1936, author of homestead exemption; discovered oil in Jeff Davis Parish in 1901
 June James, NFL player
 Edith Killgore Kirkpatrick (born 1918), member of Louisiana Board of Regents, 1978–1990; music educator; Baptist state official
 Monte Ledbetter, American football player
 Pat Rapp, Former MLB player (San Francisco Giants, Florida Marlins, Kansas City Royals, Boston Red Sox, Baltimore Orioles, Anaheim Angels)
 Guy Sockrider, member of the Louisiana State Senate from Jennings from 1948 to 1964; industrialist in Jennings and later Lake Charles
 Donald Ellsworth Walter, U.S. District Judge for the United States District Court for the Western District of Louisiana, based in Shreveport; U.S. attorney from 1969 to 1977, born in Jennings in 1936
 Travis Etienne (born 1999), American football running back for the Jacksonville Jaguars.

Education
Jefferson Davis Parish Public Schools operates public schools serving Jennings. The schools serving Jennings, all within the city, include Ward Elementary School (PK-2), Jennings Elementary School (3-6), and Jennings High School (7-12) .

Bethel Christian School is a PreK-12 Christian school located in unincorporated Jefferson Davis Parish, near Jennings.

Jefferson Davis Parish Library operates the Headquarters Branch at 118 West Plaquemine Street in Jennings. In addition the City of Jennings operates the Jennings Carnegie Public Library at 303 North Cary Avenue.

Our Lady Immaculate (OLI) is a Catholic school serving grades PREK-8.

References

External links

 City of Jennings

Cities in Louisiana
Cities in Jefferson Davis Parish, Louisiana
Cities